The following is a list of episodes for the YTV animated series, Kid vs. Kat that ran from October 25, 2008, to June 4, 2011. The series was produced by Studio B Productions, in association with YTV and Jetix Europe for its first season and Disney XD Europe for its second season. A total of 52 episodes aired.

Series overview

Episodes

Season 1: 2008–09 
Season 1 premiered on October 25, 2008, and ended on November 30, 2009.

Season 2: 2010–11 
Season 2 premiered on September 11, 2010, and ended on June 4, 2011.

Shorts
The series was accompanied by a total of 27 shorts. Season 1 featured 13 shorts while Season 2 had 14.

Season 1

Season 2

Notes

Lists of Canadian children's animated television series episodes